Elections to Antrim Borough Council were held on 21 May 1997 on the same day as the other Northern Irish local government elections. The election used three district electoral areas to elect a total of 19 councillors.

Election results

Note: "Votes" are the first preference votes.

Districts summary

|- class="unsortable" align="centre"
!rowspan=2 align="left"|Ward
! % 
!Cllrs
! % 
!Cllrs
! %
!Cllrs
! %
!Cllrs
! % 
!Cllrs
! %
!Cllrs
!rowspan=2|TotalCllrs
|- class="unsortable" align="center"
!colspan=2 bgcolor="" | UUP
!colspan=2 bgcolor="" | SDLP
!colspan=2 bgcolor="" | DUP
!colspan=2 bgcolor="" | Alliance
!colspan=2 bgcolor="" | Sinn Féin
!colspan=2 bgcolor="white"| Others
|-
|align="left"|Antrim North West
|30.7
|1
|bgcolor="#99FF66"|36.0
|bgcolor="#99FF66"|2
|15.9
|1
|3.1
|0
|14.3
|1
|0.0
|0
|5
|-
|align="left"|Antrim South East
|bgcolor="40BFF5"|48.4
|bgcolor="40BFF5"|4
|19.6
|1
|15.2
|1
|10.6
|1
|0.0
|0
|6.2
|0
|7
|-
|align="left"|Antrim Town
|bgcolor="40BFF5"|46.1
|bgcolor="40BFF5"|4
|22.7
|1
|15.4
|1
|10.2
|1
|0.0
|0
|5.6
|0
|7
|-
|- class="unsortable" class="sortbottom" style="background:#C9C9C9"
|align="left"| Total
|43.0
|9
|26.0
|4
|16.0
|3
|8.2
|2
|4.3
|1
|2.5
|0
|19
|-
|}

Districts results

Antrim North West

1993: 2 x SDLP, 1 x Sinn Féin, 1 x DUP, 1 x UUP
1997: 2 x SDLP, 1 x Sinn Féin, 1 x DUP, 1 x UUP
1993-1997 Change: No change

Antrim South East

1993: 3 x UUP, 1 x DUP, 1 x SDLP, 1 x Alliance, 1 x Independent Unionist
1997: 4 x UUP, 1 x DUP, 1 x SDLP, 1 x Alliance
1993-1997 Change: Independent Unionist joins UUP

Antrim Town

1993: 4 x UUP, 1 x DUP, 1 x SDLP, 1 x Alliance
1997: 4 x UUP, 1 x DUP, 1 x SDLP, 1 x Alliance
1993-1997 Change: No change

References

Antrim Borough Council elections
Antrim